Alex de Minaur defeated Lorenzo Sonego in the final, 4–6, 6–4, 7–6(7–5), to win the men's singles tennis title at the 2021 Eastbourne International. It was De Minaur's fifth career ATP Tour singles title and his first on grass. Sonego was contesting in his second grass final to win his third career title.

Taylor Fritz was the defending champion from when the event was last held in 2019, but he withdrew before the beginning of the tournament after incurring a knee injury during the French Open.

Seeds
The top four seeds received a bye into the second round.

Draw

Finals

Top half

Bottom half

Qualifying

Seeds

Qualifiers

Lucky losers

Qualifying draw

First qualifier

Second qualifier

Third qualifier

Fourth qualifier

References

External links
Main draw
Qualifying draw

2021 ATP Tour
2021 Men's Singles